Sultan Idris Shah II Bridge or Jambatan Sultan Idris Shah II is a bridge in Perak Tengah District, Perak, Malaysia. It is located on Ipoh-Lumut Highway Federal route Federal Route 5 crossing Perak River in Bota connecting Bota Kiri and Bota Kanan. The bridge was named after the 33rd Sultan of Perak, Almarhum Sultan Idris Al-Mutawakkil Allahi Shah II Afifullah.

History

In 1967, the old Bota Bridge FT5 was collapsed due to a huge flood, effectively cutting off the transportation link between Ipoh and Lumut. As a result, a new replacement bridge known as the Sultan Idris Shah II Bridge FT5 was constructed with the total cost of RM3.1 million. The new Sultan Idris Shah II Bridge FT5 was completed in 1973 and was opened to motorists in February 1973.

References

See also
Malaysia Federal Route 5

Bridges completed in 1973
Bridges completed in 2007
Bridges in Perak
Perak Tengah District